Marjan Kandus (born 23 September 1932) is a Slovenian former basketball player. He represented the Yugoslavia national basketball team internationally.

National team career 
Kandus was a member of the Yugoslavia national team that competed in the men's tournament at the 1960 Summer Olympics.

References

1932 births
Living people
Basketball players at the 1960 Summer Olympics
Competitors at the 1959 Mediterranean Games
KK Olimpija players
Mediterranean Games gold medalists for Yugoslavia
Olympic basketball players of Yugoslavia
Slovenian men's basketball players
Sportspeople from Maribor
Yugoslav men's basketball players
Mediterranean Games medalists in basketball